Chroma, Greek for color, may refer to:

Color
 Chrominance or chroma, a component of a television signal
 Chroma, a type of colorfulness
 Chroma, a measure of color purity in the Munsell color system

Business
 Chroma ATE, a Taiwanese electronics company
 Enchroma, a lens technology and eyewear company

Literature
 Chroma: A Queer Literary Journal, a UK-based journal
 Chroma, a short story collection by Frederick Barthelme
 Chroma, a book by Derek Jarman
 Chroma, a character in The Phantom Tollbooth by Norton Juster

Music
 Chroma feature, a quality of a musical pitch class
 Chroma (album), an album by Cartel
 ARP Chroma or Rhodes Chroma, a polyphonic synthesizer
 "Chroma", a contemporary composition by Rebecca Saunders

Video games
 Chroma, a canceled 2014 video game by Harmonix
 Chroma and Chroma Prime, playable characters from Warframe
 Chroma, a fictional city in the video game "De Blob"
 Chroma, a fictional supernatural force in the video game Fahrenheit
 Chroma, a profession in the video game Phantom Brave

Other uses
 Chroma (ballet), a ballet by Wayne McGregor
 Chroma key, a post-production technique for compositing two images or video streams
Chroma, was a series of videos produced by french youtuber Karim Debbache

See also
Brightness
Chromatica, an album by Lady Gaga
Croma (disambiguation)